The 1958–59 NBA season was the Detroit Pistons' 11th season in the NBA and second season in the city of Detroit.  The team played at Olympia Stadium in Detroit.

The team finished with a 28-44 (.389) record, third in the Western Division, but advanced to the playoffs, dropping the Western Conference semi-final 2-1 to the Minneapolis Lakers.  The team was led guard Gene Shue (17.6 ppg, NBA All-Star) and center Walter Dukes (13.0 ppg, 13.3 rpg).  The Pistons traded away NBA All-Star George Yardley to the Syracuse Nationals during the season in a trade that netted Ed Conlin.

Regular season

Season standings

x – clinched playoff spot

Record vs. opponents

Game log

Playoffs

|- align="center" bgcolor="#ffcccc"
| 1
| March 14
| @ Minneapolis
| L 89–92
| Phil Jordon (22)
| Minneapolis Auditorium
| 0–1
|- align="center" bgcolor="#ccffcc"
| 2
| March 15
| Minneapolis
| W 117–103
| Gene Shue (32)
| Detroit Olympia
| 1–1
|- align="center" bgcolor="#ffcccc"
| 3
| March 18
| @ Minneapolis
| L 102–129
| Gene Shue (31)
| Minneapolis Auditorium
| 1–2
|-

References

Detroit Pistons seasons
Detroit
Detroit Pistons
Detroit Pistons